El Fashn (from ) is a city in Egypt. It is situated near the southern borders of Beni Suef Governorate.

The city was called Phebichis in Ptolemaic and Byzantine Egypt.

See also

 List of cities and towns in Egypt

References 

Populated places in Beni Suef Governorate